The 2019–21 Bundesliga was the 75th season of the Bundesliga, Germany's premier field hockey league. It began on 7 September 2019 and it concluded with the championship final on 9 May 2021 in Mannheim. Due to the COVID-19 pandemic the league was suspended on 13 March until 1 April 2020. The season returned on 5 September 2020 and was extended into 2021 with an extra round of matches.

For the 2019–21 season, the German Hockey Federation introduced a new format. The league was played by twelve teams grouped in two pools of six (Pool A and Pool B) based on the previous season's ranking. The teams of the same pool competed 2 times and faced the teams of the other pool once. The first four of each pool qualified for the play-offs and the last two of each pool played the play-downs.

Club an der Alster were the two-time defending champions.

Teams

A total of 12 teams participated in the 2019–2021 edition of the Bundesliga. The promoted teams were Großflottbek and Rüsselsheimer who replaced TSV Mannheim and Bremer HC.

Number of teams by state

Regular season

Pool A

Pool B

Overall table

Play–downs
The play-downs were played in a best of three format with the first match hosted by the weaker-placed team on 24 or 25 April and the return match and potential third decisive match hosted by the better placed team on 1 and 2 May respectively.

|}

 
 
 
Grossflottbeker THGC won the series 2–1.

Play–offs
The quarter-finals were played in a best of three format with the first match hosted by the weaker-placed team on 25 April and the return match and potential third decisive match hosted by the better placed team on 1 and 2 May respectively. The semi-finals and final were hosted by Mannheimer HC in Mannheim, Baden-Württemberg.

Bracket

Quarter-finals

|}

 
 
 
Mannheimer HC won the series 2–1.

Rot-Weiss Köln won the series 2–1.

Düsseldorfer HC won the series 2–0.

Club an der Alster won the series 2–0.

Semi-finals

Final

Top goalscorers

References

External links
Official website

Bundesliga
Bundesliga
Feldhockey-Bundesliga 2019-20
Feldhockey-Bundesliga 2019-20
Feldhockey-Bundesliga 2019-20
Feldhockey-Bundesliga